San Salvatore is a romanesque-style, former basilica church located in the center of Spoleto, Province of Perugia, region of Umbria, Italy.

The Lombards’ renovation of the church dates back to the eighth century and it is testimony to the architectural style of the Longobardia Minor, “marking the transition from Antiquity to the European Middle Ages”.

In 2011 was declared a UNESCO world heritage property as part of the series of sites known as “Longobards in Italy. Places of the power (568-774 A.C.)”, which comprises seven sites throughout Italy characterized by lombard elements of architecture, painting, sculpture and art. Beside the nearby Clitunno Tempietto (PG), the other five sites are:  the castrum with the Torba Tower and the church outside the walls Santa Maria foris portas (VA), the monumental area with the monastic complex of San Salvatore-Santa Giulia (BS), the Gastaldaga area and the Episcopal complex (UD), the Santa Sofia complex (BN) and the Sanctuary of San Michele (FG). San Salvatore is located in the monumental cemetery of Spoleto, upon Ciciano hill, outside the medieval town walls. The cemetery was designed in 1836 by the architect Ireneo Aleandri.

Gallery

See also
History of medieval Arabic and Western European domes

References

Churches in Spoleto
Romanesque architecture in Spoleto
9th-century churches in Italy